Elizabeth Jane Barker (born 16 May 1975) is an English television presenter, best known for her work on Blue Peter from 2000 to 2006.

Early life and education
Born in Cambridge, Barker grew up in the village of Oakington, near Cambridge and attended Impington Village College before undertaking a philosophy degree at the University of Southampton. After this was completed, she became a runner for independent production company Lion TV, a researcher, and eventually the sports presenter for BBC Choice programme Backstage.

Career
On 23 June 2000 Barker joined the children's television programme Blue Peter. During her six years on the programme she reported from Vietnam, Morocco, Brazil, Austria, Greece, India and the U.S. Her adventures included an inverted spin in a jet, lawn mower racing, paragliding, walking a circus high-wire, cleaning windows at London's Canary Wharf tower. She won a bronze medal in the two-woman Bob at the British Bobsleigh championships and once held the Guinness World Record for putting on a duvet cover.

She interviewed top celebrities, including David Beckham, Quentin Blake and Elton John, whom she presented with a Gold Blue Peter badge in Las Vegas. She also raced former Formula 1 World Champion Lewis Hamilton at go-karts. She met the Queen at BBC Television Centre, where her colleague Simon Thomas presented Her Majesty with a Gold Blue Peter badge. In the show's adventure serial The Quest she cameoed as Elizabeth I, Queen Victoria and Beatrix Potter.

In 2003, Barker won the Children & Youth category in the CRE Race in the Media Awards for her film on Auschwitz for the Holocaust Memorial Day with survivor Kitty Hart-Moxon.

On 25 May 2004 Barker announced that she was pregnant with her first child, by husband Michael Todd. A boy, Dexter Jack Barker Todd, was born on Saturday 4 December 2004 and featured on the show many times, including at just 13 days old, on his first birthday and on Barker's leaving date. She became the first presenter to rejoin Blue Peter after having a baby, but on 23 January 2006 she told viewers that she would be leaving the programme at Easter and moving away from London so she could spend more time with her family. She was replaced by Zöe Salmon, who originally took Liz's place in December 2004 when she had her baby.

During her six years on Blue Peter Barker presented with Konnie Huq, Simon Thomas, Matt Baker, Zöe Salmon and Gethin Jones.

On 11 April 2006 Barker left the programme with a special This Is Your Life-style show devoted to her, featuring former presenters, family, friends and people she had met along her Blue Peter travels, including Kitty Hart-Moxon. She also announced, on her last live show, that she would be co-presenting a new CBBC show, Totally Doctor Who, with CBBC's Barney Harwood; the first episode was broadcast on 13 April 2006.

On 18 September 2006 it was announced on Blue Peter that Liz was due to have another baby and on 20 February 2007 it was announced on Blue Peter that she had given birth to a girl called Poppy. She has since given birth to Rocco Winston Todd in 2011 and Gus Lennon Todd in 2013.

After she left TV Barker spent several years working for her family's chain of bakeries. She is currently a radio presenter on radio station Cambridge 105 and has worked largely in voiceovers, including the Sony PlayStation game Buzz! Junior: Jungle Party. She was the voiceover artist for the 2016, 2017 & 2018 NMG Awards, held in Cambridge and is also a presenter of the annual Fiver Awards, held in London. In July 2019, she appeared in the WriteOn production Sink or Swim at the Corpus Playroom, Cambridge

Filmography

References

External links 
 

Alumni of the University of Southampton
Blue Peter presenters
English reporters and correspondents
English television presenters
People from Cambridge
1975 births
Living people
People from Oakington